Stenocorus cinnamopterus is a species of beetles in the family Cerambycidae. The species is brown with orange legs.

References

Lepturinae